In Greek mythology, Cestrinus (Ancient Greek: Κεστρῖνος means "pieces of the fish") was the only son of Helenus and Andromache.

Mythology 
According to Pausanias, Cestrinus was upset when Andromache's son Molossus succeeded Helenus to the throne of Epirus. Taking a group of Epirotian volunteers, he claimed the region of Epirus north of the River Thyamis and it is because of him that the region was named Cestrine. According to another tradition, Cestrinus was king of Cimmerian Bosporus, being equated with King Genger.

Notes

Trojans

References 

 Pausanias, Description of Greece with an English Translation by W.H.S. Jones, Litt.D., and H.A. Ormerod, M.A., in 4 Volumes. Cambridge, MA, Harvard University Press; London, William Heinemann Ltd. 1918. . Online version at the Perseus Digital Library
 Pausanias, Graeciae Descriptio. 3 vols. Leipzig, Teubner. 1903.  Greek text available at the Perseus Digital Library.

12th-century BC rulers